Eliya is a genus of grasshoppers in the subfamily Catantopinae with no tribe assigned.  Species can be found in Sri Lanka.

Species
The Orthoptera Species File. lists:
 Eliya gibbosa Henry, 1933
 Eliya pedestris Uvarov, 1927
 Eliya pictipes Uvarov, 1927
 Eliya venusta Henry, 1933

References

External Links 
 

Acrididae genera
Catantopinae 
Orthoptera of Asia